Live in Paris & Ottawa 1968 is a posthumous live album by the Jimi Hendrix Experience, released on September 5, 2008, by Dagger Records. The album contains songs from the band's performances at the L'Olympia Theatre in Paris on January 29, 1968, and the Capitol Theatre in Ottawa, Ontario, Canada, on March 19, 1968.

The concert in Paris had been issued as part of the 1991 box set Stages. The three songs from the concert in Ottawa are sourced from a previously undiscovered tape and were recorded during the first show of that evening. The second show at the Capitol Theatre in Ottawa had been issued in October 2001 as the  album Live in Ottawa.

Track listing

Personnel
Jimi Hendrixguitar, vocals
Mitch Mitchelldrums
Noel Reddingbass guitar; rhythm guitar on "Red House" (playing the bass strings, not lead guitar, as on the studio recording of "Red House")

Live albums published posthumously
Jimi Hendrix live albums
2008 live albums
Dagger Records live albums
Albums recorded at the Olympia (Paris)